All the Women I Am is the twenty-eighth studio album by American country music singer Reba McEntire. It was released November 9, 2010, through the Valory Music Group, a division of Big Machine Records. Its first single is "Turn On the Radio", which was released in July and debuted at #54 and peaked at #1 in January 2011. The second single "If I Were a Boy" and was released in January 2011 and re-entered the Billboard Country Charts at #60, peaking at #22 in April 2011. The third single, "When Love Gets a Hold of You", was released on April 11, 2011, peaking at #40 in six weeks. McEntire's fourth single from the album was "Somebody's Chelsea," which peaked at #44. The album was produced by Dann Huff. As of 2012 it is her 1st studio album since 1984's Just a Little Love not to be certified.

Background 
The title of the album relates to the many roles that McEntire plays in her life. Asked once in an interview for a ranking, McEntire responded, "Mother first, wife second, and the rest just follow." The album features a cover of American recording artist Beyoncé Knowles' single "If I Were a Boy". McEntire's version became a viral video when she first performed the song on CMT's Unplugged earlier in 2010. Reba's next album was supposed to be a Christmas album but the song 'If I Were a Boy' changed McEntire's mind.

Critical reception

Upon its release, All the Women I Am received generally positive reviews from most music critics. At Metacritic, which assigns a normalized rating out of 100 to reviews from mainstream critics, the album received an average score of 74, based on 5 reviews, which indicates "generally favorable reviews".

Michael McCall with the Associated Press gave it a mixed review, saying "at age 55, McEntire remains a powerhouse who tends to err by trying harder than necessary to show her range". Jessica Phillips of Country Weekly gave the album four star rating, calling the release "[an] emotionally charged set of songs" and commended her cover of "If I Were A Boy", calling it a "soulful, countrified look at love from a male perspective".

Giving the release a 3½ star rating, Matt Bjorke of Roughstock, saying "All The Woman I Am had the potential to be a missed-opportunity after the first two tracks on the record but the album is saved by a meaty collection of songs that hopefully will find Reba retaining her current resurgence at radio". Allison Stewart with The Washington Post'''' compared the album to its predecessor, Keep On Loving You, saying that the album "tries harder, with worse results; McEntire and her collaborators aim for Carrie Underwood and too often wind up with warmed-over Shania Twain". On a positive note, she called her version of "If I Were a Boy" "fantastic". Thom Jurek with Allmusic gave the release a 2½ rating, saying "Everything, from songs and arrangements to production tries hard to sound on the contemporary edge, but comes off as underscoring that Underwood has the corner on this sound [...] ultimately, All the Women I Am falls flat; it feels awkward in its stylistic mimicry, and has no center".

Steve Morse with The Boston Globe called it "one of her best effort", saying "It blends hard-edged, modern country-rock with some profoundly tender ballad singing". Blake Boldt with "Engine 145" gave it a 3½ star rating, saying "Women'' is a crash course in dealing with emotional hurdles. There’s a great deal of value when McEntire sings about volatile emotions, and she builds a rapport with female listeners by admitting her own frailties".

Commercial performance
The album debuted at number seven on the U.S. Billboard 200, and at number three on the Top Country Albums chart, selling 64,174 copies in its first week of release.  The album has sold 347,000 copies in the US as of April 2015.

Track listing

Personnel 
Adapted from the album's liner notes.

Musicians 
 Reba McEntire – lead vocals
 Charlie Judge – keyboards, synthesizers, synth strings, synth horns, Rhodes piano, clavinet, Hammond B3 organ, programming, string arrangements and conductor (8, 10)
 Gordon Mote – acoustic piano
 Steve Nathan – acoustic piano, Hammond B3 organ
 Jimmy Nichols – acoustic piano, Wurlitzer electric piano
 Tom Bukovac – electric guitar
 J. T. Corenflos – electric guitar
 Dann Huff – electric guitar, acoustic guitar, banjo
 Jerry McPherson – acoustic guitar, electric guitar
 Ilya Toshinsky – acoustic guitar, electric guitar, banjo, mandolin
 Bruce Bouton – steel guitar
 Paul Franklin – steel guitar, dobro
 Jimmie Lee Sloas – bass guitar
 Shannon Forrest – drums
 Scott Williamson – drums
 David Huff – percussion, programming 
 Eric Darken – percussion
 Mark Douthit – saxophone
 Stuart Duncan – fiddle
 Jonathan Yudkin – fiddle
 Carl Gorodetzky – string contractor (8, 10)
 The Nashville String Machine – strings (8, 10)
 Vicki Hampton – backing vocals
 Joanna Janét – backing vocals
 Cherie Oakley – backing vocals
 Angela Primm – backing vocals
 Russell Terrell – backing vocals
 Jenifer Wrinkle – backing vocals

Production notes 
 Dann Huff – producer
 Allison Jones – A&R
 Velvet Reid – A&R
 Brent King – recording
 Steve Marcantonio – recording, mixing
 Justin Niebank – recording, mixing 
 Mark Hagen – additional recording
 Seth Morton – additional recording
 Steve Blackmon – recording assistant
 Drew Bollman – recording assistant
 Tristan Brock-Jones – recording assistant
 David Huff – digital editing
 Christopher Rowe – digital editing
 Adam Ayan – mastering
 Hank Williams – mastering
Mike "Frog" Griffith – production coordinator
 Whitney Sutton – copy coordinator 
 Austin Hale – package design 
 Aaron Rayburn – package design 
 Josh Shearon – package design 
 Russ Harrington – photography 
 Justin Nolan Key – photography
 Brett Freedman – hair stylist, makeup 
 Terry Gordon – wardrobe

Charts

Weekly charts

Year-end charts

Singles

Release history

References

2010 albums
Reba McEntire albums
Big Machine Records albums
Albums produced by Dann Huff